"Dagenham Dave" is a song by Morrissey, released as a single in August 1995, a week prior to the release of Southpaw Grammar. It was Morrissey's first release on RCA, the label he had signed to after leaving EMI. This was the second Morrissey solo single not to feature the singer on the cover, instead English football coach and former player Terry Venables is pictured sticking out his tongue. Venables was born in Dagenham.

The promotional video for the single featured former Grange Hill actor Mark Savage as the titular Dave.

The single reached number 26 on the UK Singles Chart.

It is not related to the song of the same name by The Stranglers, from their 1977 album No More Heroes. "Dagenham Dave" is also naval slang for someone who is somewhat unstable or crazy, Dagenham being close to Barking ("barking mad").

Track listings
All tracks by Morrissey/Alain Whyte.

7": RCA / 29980 7 (UK)
 "Dagenham Dave"
 "Nobody Loves Us"

 also available on MC (29980 4)

CD: RCA / 29980 2 (UK)
 "Dagenham Dave"
 "Nobody Loves Us"
 "You Must Please Remember"

Reviews
NME gave a negative review, saying that this single showed that "Morrissey has become the embarrassing incontinent grandfather of Britpop". The song was described as "piss-poor old crap" and a "tune-impaired three-minute drone". Ned Raggett of AllMusic described it as "the least distinct song on the whole album".

However, in other reviews, the opinion was that the song was "very good". It was a unique style which Morrissey had embraced during the height of the Britpop era.

In his book Mozipedia, Simon Goddard called it "a mettlesome pop cartoon featuring, if nothing else, the greatest utterance of the word 'pie' by any singer in the entire history of recorded music."

Musicians
 Morrissey: lead vocals
 Alain Whyte: guitar
 Boz Boorer: guitar
 Jonny Bridgwood: bass
 Spencer Cobrin: drums

Live performances
The song was performed live by Morrissey on his 1995 and 1997 tours.

See also
 Mondeo Man

References

Morrissey songs
1995 singles
Songs written by Morrissey
Songs written by Alain Whyte
Song recordings produced by Steve Lillywhite
1995 songs
RCA Records singles